The Netherlands was represented by duo Maxine and Franklin Brown, with the song "De eerste keer", at the 1996 Eurovision Song Contest, which took place in Oslo on 18 May.

Before Eurovision

Nationaal Songfestival 1996 
Five acts participated in the Dutch preselection, which consisted of five qualifying rounds, followed by the final on 3 March 1996.

Heats 
Five qualifying heats took place on consecutive evenings between 26 February and 1 March 1996. Each involved one of the selected acts performing three songs, with the televoting winner from each act going forward to the final.

Final
The final was held on 3 March at the Cinevideo Studio in Almere, hosted by Ivo Niehe. The winning song was chosen by voting from 13 regional juries, and "De eerste keer" emerged as the winner by an 11-point margin. The show was also broadcast in Belgium on BRTN.

At Eurovision 
In 1996, for the only time in Eurovision history, an audio-only pre-qualifying round of the 29 songs entered (excluding hosts Norway who were exempt) was held in March in order for the seven lowest-scoring songs to be eliminated before the final. "De eerste keer" placed 9th, thus qualifying for the final.

On the night of the final the pair performed 15th in the running order, following Slovenia and preceding Belgium. At the close of the voting "De eerste keer" had received 78 points from 15 countries (including a maximum 12 from Austria), placing the Netherlands 7th of the 23 entries. The Dutch jury awarded its 12 points to contest winners Ireland.

The Dutch jury consisted of 8 professional jurors and 8 representatives of public. Sandra de Jong was the non-voting chairperson.

The Dutch conductor at the contest was Dick Bakker.

Voting

Qualifying round

Final

References

External links
 Netherlands selection 1996

1996
Countries in the Eurovision Song Contest 1996
Eurovision